Jay Bernstein (June 7, 1937 – April 30, 2006) was an American producer and manager to actors, such as Sammy Davis Jr. and Michael Landon, and to actresses, such as Farrah Fawcett and Suzanne Somers.

Career
Born in Oklahoma City, Oklahoma, Bernstein moved to California after graduating from Pomona College. He worked in the mail room of the William Morris Agency before working for
Rogers & Cowan, the industry's largest PR company, founded by Henry C. Rogers and Warren Cowan. Bernstein founded his own agency in 1962 and later produced the television series Bring 'Em Back Alive, Mike Hammer, and Houston Knights. He also produced several television movies and the film Nothing Personal (1980) starring Suzanne Somers. In 2005, Bernstein had obtained the rights from the City of Los Angeles to produce a brand new prime time TV series entitled Public Defender, based on the true criminal cases from the Los Angeles Public Defender's office from years past.

Personal life
Bernstein also discovered the
21-year-old European model-turned-actress and entrepreneur Simona Fusco.

Death
On Sunday, April 30, 2006, Bernstein died at age 68 after suffering a stroke. He was survived by his only child, Amber Bernstein.

Additional information
 "Jay Bernstein, Starmaker", of E! True Hollywood Story 2000 TV Episode

References

External links
 Official site
 

1937 births
2006 deaths
American entertainment industry businesspeople
Film producers from California
American public relations people
Television producers from California
Businesspeople from Oklahoma City
Pomona College alumni
Film producers from Oklahoma
20th-century American businesspeople